The year 1908 in architecture involved some significant architectural events and new buildings.

Events
 April 6 – The foundation stone of Knox College, Otago, is laid.
 St. Mary's Church, Wellingborough, England, is designed by Ninian Comper.
 The Georgian Society is founded in Dublin on the 21st of February 1908 by John Pentland Mahaffy, Walter G. Strickland and Richard Orpen.

Buildings and structures

Buildings opened

 May 1 – Singer Building in New York City, completed with tower, designed by Ernest Flagg. It is the world's tallest building for a year. Demolished 1968.
 July 20 – Casa de Nariño, official residence of the President of Colombia, Bogotá, Colombia, designed by Gastón Lelarge.
 November 8 – Chamber of Commerce and Industry of Meurthe-et-Moselle in Nancy, France, designed by Emile Toussaint and Louis Marchal and featuring ironwork by Louis Majorelle and stained glass by Jacques Gruber.

Buildings completed

 The Gamble House in Pasadena, California, designed by Henry Mather Greene and Charles Sumner Greene.
 British Medical Association Building, London, designed by Charles Holden with sculptures by Jacob Epstein, is completed.
 St. Andrew's United Church in Cairo, Egypt.
 St. Patrick's Church, Toronto, Canada, designed by Arthur W. Holmes.
 Sint-Petrus-en-Pauluskerk, Ostend, Belgium, designed by Louis Delacenserie.
 Unity Temple, Oak Park, Illinois, United States, designed by Frank Lloyd Wright.
 Old Colony Club on Madison Avenue in New York City, designed by Stanford White of McKim, Mead & White.

Awards
 RIBA Royal Gold Medal – Honore Daumet

Births
 January 7 – Frederick Gibberd, English architect (died 1984)
 May 23 – Max Abramovitz, American architect (died 2004)
 October 13 – Francis Skinner, Malaysian-born English architect (died 1998)
 December 22 – Max Bill, Swiss architect, painter, typeface designer, industrial designer and graphic designer (died 1994)

Deaths
 January 2 – Alexander Davidson, Scottish architect active in Australia, 68
 February 3 – Ferdinand Meldahl, Danish architect best known for the reconstruction of Frederiksborg Palace, 80
 February 13 – Sir James Knowles, English architect and editor, 76
 September 15 – Friedrich Adler, German architect and archaeologist, 80
 November 26 – William Swinden Barber, English architect, 76

References